The technical rehearsal or tech rehearsal is a rehearsal that focuses on the technological aspects of the performance, in theatrical, musical, and filmed entertainment.

Types
Tech rehearsals generally are broken down into four types: dry tech rehearsals, tech rehearsals, pick-up tech rehearsals, and paper tech. Their purpose is to fully test all of the technology being used in the performance (lighting, sound, automation, special effects (e.g. pyrotechnics), etc.) to diagnose and prevent mistakes from occurring during the actual performance. They also allow the designers to see how their designs will impact each other (i.e. how the color of a light might affect the look of a costume), and to make final changes. Tech rehearsals are to make sure during the show all tech items will run smooth.

Dry tech
The dry tech is essentially a rehearsal without the performers. It is a period, usually lasting multiple hours, where each designer and department head runs his or her segment of the production. It is also a chance for the tech crew who will operate the equipment to become familiar with the flow of the performance. Usually it consists of the lights being cued in sequential order, fixing any problems along the way such as brightness, angle, framing, or position.

Then a sound check is initiated to check the levels of the music, sound effects, or microphones to be used during the performance. Changes are made as necessary to correct volume, pitch, or feedback problems.

Lastly, for stage shows, the fly rigs or battens are tested for weight and accuracy of cueing with sound and lights.  If there are moving set pieces, the crew will test their operation and mechanics (if they are automated) and practice their movement, flow, and position on and offstage.

There may be an extra step for particularly effect-intensive productions, such as film, TV, or Broadway-style stage shows, where the crew tests any special effects that require systems such as rain, fire, or explosions. When these effects are completed to the director's and production designer's satisfaction, the crew is ready to move onto the tech.

Tech
The tech rehearsal includes the performers as well as production staff or crew members. It is a rehearsal that focuses on the technological aspects of the performance in theatrical, musical, and filmed entertainment. It runs through the entire production, either in its entirety or cue-to-cue. A cue (theatrical) -to-cue is when the sound and lights are run with certain parts of scenes within the production. Usually, a scene will start with the first few lines and then skip to the lines and staged blocking for the next lighting, sound, or other cues. This whole process can take many hours, and though it is beneficial for all aspects of production, it can become very tedious. Tech rehearsals have been known to run long hours, mainly due to multiple runs of the show within the tech.

Often included in the tech are the final show props. These props differ from rehearsal props because they are not just placeholders but the props to be used in the actual production. This is so that a performer can become acquainted with using the true prop before the actual performance so as not to look awkward when using it. It is also to test the durability of the final prop, as well as how the props will look under the final stage lighting.

Costumes are usually reserved for use starting with the dress rehearsal, but they are sometimes brought in to test the costumes against the final stage lighting as well, so as not to produce a conflict in color differentiation in the final product. Also, costume pieces that restrict movement or fit strangely such as shoes, hats, gloves and so on may be added either in their final form or (usually) in rehearsal form approximating size, shape, etc. to allow actors to get used to them in advance. Sometimes actors will get dressed in costume for the first time and come on stage so the production staff can see the costumes in their finished form for the first time under stage lighting. This is called a costume parade.

During the tech, all of the previous actions taken during the dry tech are repeated, so as to check lighting in concordance with the stage blocking and stage placement (for example, finding whether the performer is in the light hotspot or not, or how the followspot operates), check the levels on the performers' microphones (if used) and how well the performers can project if orating concurrently with sound or music, allow the performers to know when there are incoming flying rigs, allow performers to experience and become accustomed to the special effects that will occur so that it will not interfere with the actual performance and generally make sure the director and designers are happy with all aspects of the production that can be seen or heard. One very significant effect that is added in tech is blood. This allows actors to get used to it and the costume designer to see how the blood will affect the costumes.

Once completed as many times as the director feels comfortable, the tech will end. Any number of actions can usually be taken after a tech such as the running of problematic scenes or acts, another dry tech to work out problematic technical issues, or certain performers may be held to work with certain effects for which the other performers are not needed. After all this is completed, the tech rehearsal is officially over.  The next rehearsal(s) to be performed is the dress rehearsal, followed by final dress rehearsal just prior to opening night.

Pick-up tech
Pick-up tech rehearsals are scheduled. Pick-ups usually consist of covering problem areas from previous shows, rehearsing difficult effects or transitions, or rehearsing newly introduced technical aspects. Usually lasting no longer than a few hours, they will sometimes be held on different days or times as performance pick-ups so as not to bog down the performers or to detract from the performing rehearsal aspect of the show.

If the show is on tour, additional tech rehearsals may be held to cover issues that might arise from being in a different size/shape performance space. Issues might include: set size, timing, lighting angles and intensity, offstage storage, etc.  Due to the fast-paced nature of tours, often there is very little or no time for additional tech rehearsals.

Paper tech
Sometimes, prior to getting into the theatre, each of the designers (lighting, sound, scenic, and costumes) will meet with the stage manager to discuss lighting and sound cues, costume changes and movement of the scenery.  This process is called paper tech because all of the technical aspects are written down on paper.  The stage manager will place all of this information into the prompt book.

See also
Technical week

References

Film production
Stagecraft